Cyclopentadienyl can refer to

Cyclopentadienyl anion, or cyclopentadienide, 
Cyclopentadienyl ligand
Cyclopentadienyl radical, •
Cyclopentadienyl cation,

See also
Pentadienyl